Derek Russell (born July 22, 1969) is a former American football wide receiver who played college football at the University of Arkansas and seven seasons in the NFL for the Denver Broncos and the Houston, then Tennessee, Oilers. In his four years at Arkansas, he helped the Razorbacks win two Southwest Conference championships in 1988 and 1989, and was the option running team's big play deep threat in the passing game. His senior year at Little Rock Central High, he quarterbacked the Tigers to a state title. His most productive season in the NFL came in 1993 with the Broncos when he caught 44 passes for 719 yards and 3 TDs in thirteen games with twelve starts. 

Russell also ran the high hurdles for the powerhouse Razorback track team, helping them win five NCAA Indoor Track & Field national championships.

References

1969 births
Living people
Sportspeople from Little Rock, Arkansas
American football wide receivers
Arkansas Razorbacks football players
Denver Broncos players
Houston Oilers players
Tennessee Oilers players
Arkansas Razorbacks men's track and field athletes